The Rules of Procedure of the Court of Justice (OJ L173) are a part of EU law concerning how the Court of Justice of the European Union should function.

See also
EU law

External links
Rules of Procedure since 2013

European Union law